The 1932 New Mexico gubernatorial election took place on November 8, 1932, in order to elect the Governor of New Mexico. Incumbent Democrat Arthur Seligman won reelection to a second term.

General election

Results

References

gubernatorial
1932
New Mexico